The 1987 Pilot Pen Classic was a men's tennis tournament played on outdoor hard courts. It was the 14th edition of the Indian Wells Masters and was part of the 1987 Nabisco Grand Prix. It was played at the Grand Champions Resort in Indian Wells, California in the United States from February 16 through February 23, 1987. Second-seeded Boris Becker won the singles title.

Finals

Singles

 Boris Becker defeated  Stefan Edberg 6–4, 6–4, 7–5
 It was Becker's 1st title of the year and the 13th of his career.

Doubles

 Guy Forget /  Yannick Noah defeated  Boris Becker /  Eric Jelen 6–4, 7–6
 It was Forget's 2nd title of the year and the 11th of his career. It was Noah's 3rd title of the year and the 31st of his career.

References

External links

 
 ITF tournament edition details
 ATP tournament profile

 
1987 Pilot Pen Classic
Pilot Pen Classic
Pilot Pen Classic
Pilot Pen Classic
Pilot Pen Classic